Ectropion is a medical condition in which the lower eyelid turns outwards. It is one of the notable aspects of newborns exhibiting congenital Harlequin-type ichthyosis, but ectropion can occur due to any weakening of tissue of the lower eyelid. The condition can be repaired surgically.  Ectropion is also found in dogs as an inherited, developmental condition.

Causes
Congenital
Aging
Scarring
Mechanical
Allergic
Facial nerve palsy
Anti-cancer treatments such as erlotinib, cetuximab, and panitumumab, which block the function of EGFR (the epidermal growth factor receptor).

Diagnosis
Ectropion can usually be diagnosed with a routine eye exam and physical. The eyelid's muscle tone and tightness can be assessed by pulling gently on the eyelid.

Ectropion in dogs
Ectropion in dogs usually involves the lower eyelid. Often the condition has no symptoms, but tearing and conjunctivitis may be seen. Breeds associated with ectropion include the Saint Bernard, the Bloodhound, the Clumber Spaniel, Newfoundlands, and the Neapolitan Mastiff. It can also result from trauma or nerve damage. Treatment (surgery) is recommended only if there is chronic conjunctivitis or if there is corneal damage. A small part of the affected lid is removed and then the lid is sewn back together.

See also
Cervical ectropion
Entropion

References

External links 

Dog diseases
Disorders of eyelid, lacrimal system and orbit
Congenital disorders of eyes